The Little Bear Movie is a 2001 animated adventure film based on the television series Little Bear, which in turn is based on the book series of the same name which was written by Else Holmelund Minarik and illustrated by Maurice Sendak. It was produced by Nelvana Limited and Wild Things Productions. The film was released direct-to-video on August 7, 2001, by Paramount Home Entertainment in the United States and Canada. It stars Kristin Fairlie as the voice of Little Bear and her brother Kyle Fairlie as the voice of Cub.

Plot
Little Bear and Father Bear set out on a camping trip. While camping on a hill Father Bear talks about the wilderness and the time he met an eagle. The next day Little Bear meets another bear in the wilderness called Cub. They both wrestle around in a river, Cub then chases after a moose leaving Little Bear all alone when he is met with a villainous mountain lion named Trouble, but Cub comes back and saves him from getting eaten. They then enjoy a grilled fish breakfast together with Father Bear before they decide it's time to start heading home. Little Bear asks Cub if he wants to come with them, Cub agrees.

Back at the house Cub tries to get used to living in a house. The whole family then makes Pancakes for lunch. Little Bear then wants Cub to meet his friends Cat, Owl, Duck, and Hen. When they learn that Cub got separated from his parents during a bad storm, they decide to go on a journey to search for them. They make missing person posters for Cub's parents and then head back into the wilderness to hang them up. While doing so they meet their friend Moose, he shows them that raccoons have used a poster to make a dam. Little Bear and Cub try to recover the banner, but beavers, angry with the raccoons break the dam and in the process Little Bear and Cub are washed away in a flood, straight over a waterfall getting separated from the rest of the group. They find Duck has wandered downstream as well, looking for Cub's parents.

The three become lost in the dark wilderness and are unable to find the rest of the gang. They then run into Cub's best friends Poppy and Pete, two silly red foxes who took care of Cub when he lost his parents. They spend the night in the foxes den and the next day they keep looking and head towards a canyon. There they meet Trouble again and he tries to eat Duck, but Poppy and Pete save Duck's life. Little Bear manages to scare off the mountain lion with some help from Cub's parents. Cub and his parents are reunited and Little Bear is found by his family and friends. After saying goodbye to Cub, Little Bear heads home and on the way back to the house it starts snowing.

Characters
 Little Bear (voiced by Kristin Fairlie)
 Cub (voiced by Kyle Fairlie)
 Owl (voiced by Amos Crawley)
 Duck (voiced by Tracy Ryan)
 Cat (voiced by Andrew Sabiston)
 Hen (voiced by Elizabeth Hanna)
 Trouble (voiced by Wayne Best)
 Moose (voiced by Ray Landry)
 Mother Bear (voiced by Janet Laine-Green)
 Father Bear (voiced by Dan Hennessey)
 Little Moose (voiced by Max Morrow)
 Mother Moose (voiced by Catherine Disher)
 Poppy (voiced by Cole Caplan) and Pete (voiced by Asa Perlman)
 Cub's Father (voiced by Maurice Dean Wint)
 Cub's Mother (voiced by Alison Sealy-Smith)

Music
The Little Bear Movie never had its launched soundtrack. The film contains two pieces of unknown music and the instrumental soundtrack of the series.

(1) Great Big World and (2) Everybody Wants To Paint My Picture:
Composed by: Marc Jordan and Antony Vanderberg
Performed by: Shawn Colvin

(3) The Little Bear Instrumental

Release and response
The film was released on VHS and DVD by Paramount Home Entertainment. Shawn Colvin (performer) and Marc Jordan/Antony Vanderburgh (composers) were nominated for Best Original Song at the 2001 Video Premiere Awards for the song "Great Big World".

References

External links

 
 

2001 films
2001 animated films
2001 direct-to-video films
2000s Canadian films
2000s children's animated films
2000s educational films
2000s English-language films
Canadian children's animated films
Canadian animated feature films
Canadian educational films
Canadian direct-to-video films
Animal adventure films
English-language Canadian films
Animated films based on children's books
Animated films based on animated television series
Grizzly bears in popular culture
Animated films about bears
Animated films about chickens
Animated films about children
Animated films about ducks
Films about owls
Animated films about cats
Animated films about foxes
Films about cougars
Animated films about families
Animated films about friendship
Films set in North America
Films set in forests
Films set in the 19th century
Films scored by Lesley Barber
Paramount Pictures animated films
Paramount Pictures direct-to-video films
Nelvana films
Alliance Atlantis films